Dolmatovo is a rural locality (a selo) in Velsky District, Arkhangelsk Oblast, Russia. The population was 832 as of 2010. There are 21 streets.

Geography 
Dolmatovo is located 70 km north of Velsk (the district's administrative centre) by road. Vaskovo is the nearest rural locality.

References 

Rural localities in Velsky District